Gábor Esterházy may refer to:

Gábor Esterházy (1580–1626), son of Ferenc Esterházy
Gábor Esterházy (1673–1704), son of Paul I, Prince Esterházy